Chaitanya Mahaprabhu (born Vishvambhar Mishra) was a 15th-century Indian saint who is considered to be the combined avatar of Radha and Krishna by his disciples and various scriptures. Chaitanya Mahaprabhu's mode of worshipping Krishna with ecstatic song and dance had a profound effect on Vaishnavism in Bengal. He was also the chief proponent of the Vedantic philosophy of Achintya Bheda Abheda Tattva. Mahaprabhu founded Gaudiya Vaishnavism ( the Brahma-Madhva-Gaudiya Sampradaya). He expounded Bhakti yoga and popularized the chanting of the Hare Krishna Maha-mantra. He composed the Shikshashtakam (eight devotional prayers).

Chaitanya is sometimes called Gauranga or Gaura due to his molten gold–like complexion. His birthday is celebrated as Gaura-purnima. He is also called Nimai due to him being born underneath a Neem tree.

Life

Chaitanya means "one who is conscious" (derived from Chetana, which means "Consciousness"); Maha means "Great" and Prabhu means "Lord" or "Master". Chaitanya was born as Vishvambhar Mishra, the second son of Jagannath Mishra. Jagannath and his wife, Sachi Devi, the daughter of Nilambara Chakravarti, were both Brahmins of Sylhet. Jagannath Mishra's family were from the village of Dhakadakshin in Srihatta (Sylhet), and later migrated to Nabadwip. The ruins of their ancestral home still survive in present-day Bangladesh.

According to Chaitanya Charitamrita, Chaitanya was born in Nabadwip (in present-day West Bengal) on the full moon night of 18 February 1486, at the time of a lunar eclipse.

A number of stories also exist telling of Chaitanya's apparent attraction to the chanting and singing of Krishna's names from a very young age, but largely this was perceived as being secondary to his interest in acquiring knowledge and studying Sanskrit. When travelling to Gaya to perform the Śrāddha ceremony for his departed father, Chaitanya met his guru, the ascetic Ishvara Puri, from whom he received initiation with the Gopala Krishna mantra. This meeting was to mark a significant change in Chaitanya's outlook and upon his return to Bengal the local Vaishnavas, headed by Advaita Acharya, were stunned at his external sudden 'change of heart' (from 'scholar' to 'devotee') and soon Chaitanya became the eminent leader of their Vaishnava group within Nadia.

After leaving Bengal and receiving entrance into the sannyasa order by Swami Kesava Bharati, Chaitanya journeyed throughout the length and breadth of India for several years, chanting the divine names of Krishna constantly. At that time He travelled on foot covering a lot of places like Baranagar, Mahinagar, Atisara and, at last, Chhatrabhog. Chhatrabhog is the place where Goddess Ganga and Shiva met, then one hundred mouths of Ganga were visible from here. From the source of Vrindavana Dasa's Chaitanya Bhagavata, he bathed at Ambulinga Ghat of Chhatrabhog with intimate companions with great chorus-chanting (kirtan). After staying one night he set for Puri by boat with the help of Local Administrator Ram Chandra Khan. He spent the last 24 years of his life in Puri, Odisha, the great temple city of Jagannath in the Radhakanta Math. The Gajapati king, Prataprudra Dev, regarded Chaitanya as Krishna's avatar and was an enthusiastic patron and devotee of Chaitanya's recitation (sankeertan) gatherings. It was during these years that Chaitanya is believed by his followers to have sunk deep into various Divine-Love trances (samādhi) and performed pastimes of divine ecstasy (bhakti).

Vrindavan, the land of Radha Rani, the “City of Temples” has more than 5000 temples to showcase the pastimes of Radha and Krishna. The essence of Vrindavan was lost over time until the 16th century, when it was rediscovered by Chaitanya. In the year 1515, Chaitanya visited Vrindavan, with the purpose of locating the lost holy places associated with Krishna's transcendent pastimes. He wandered through the different sacred forests of Vrindavan in a spiritual trance of divine love. It was believed that by His divine spiritual power, he was able to locate all the important places of Krishna's pastimes in and around Vrindavan including the seven main temples or sapta devalay, which are worshiped by Vaishnavas in the Chaitanya tradition to this day.

Biographies 
There are numerous biographies available from the time giving details of Chaitanya's life, the most prominent ones being the Chaitanya Charitamrita of Krishnadasa Kaviraja, the earlier Chaitanya Bhagavata of Vrindavana Dasa (both originally written in Bengali but now widely available in English and other languages), and the Chaitanya Mangala, written by "Lochana Dasa". These works are in Bengali with some Sanskrit verses interspersed. In addition to these, there are other Sanskrit biographies composed by his contemporaries. There is also Caitanya Caritāmṛta Mahākavya by Kavi Karnapura and Śrī Kṛṣṇa Caitanya Carita Maha-Kavya by Murari Gupta.

Works on Chaitanya:

 Krsna-Caitanya-Caritamrta ( 1513 or 1536–1540; Sanskrit)
 By Murari Gupta. Known as a kadcha or chronicle. Chaitanya's Navadwipa līla and each panca-tattva presented as a form of the Lord. Caitanya went for the first time to Murari's house at Navadwipa. Murari's standing and reputation for learning gave his biographical materials great weight in the Vaishnava community. This Kadcha (notes) became the guiding lines for other biographers.

 Kadcha or chronicle (Sanskrit)
 By Svarupa Damodara. He was the personal secretary of Chaitanya. Details the life of Caitanya.

 Govindadaser Kadcha (Bengali)
 By Govinda Dāsa who accompanied Chaitanya on his tour of Deccan. This poem describes their experiences on the journey and some imaginary events in the life of Chaitanya as well as his ideas and philosophy. It is another significant biographical work, but it was regarded as controversial because of the authenticity.

 Chaitanya Bhagavata ( 1535 or 1546–1550; Bengali)
 By Vrindavana Dasa Thakura. Three parts: Adi-Khanda, Mādhya-Khanda, and Antya-Khanda. Chaitanya's earlier life, activities, early movement in Navadwip.

 Krsna-Caitanya-caritra-mahakavya ( 1535)
 By Kavi Karnapura (Paramanand Sen).

 Krsna-Caitanya-candrodaya-natakam ( 1535 – 1570s)
 By Kavi Karnapura. Based on Murari Gupta's Krsna-Caitanya-Caritamrta. When Karnapura was a small child, he interacted with Chaitanya personally.

 Caitanya-candrodaya-natakam ( 1538 or 1540 or 1572 or 1579; Sanskrit)
 By Kavi Karnapura (Paramanand Sen). Dramatic play in ten acts of Chaitanya's life.

 Caitanya-caritāmṛta-kavya ( 1542 – late 1500s; Sanskrit)
 By Kavi Karnapura (Paramanand Sen). A long biographical poem on Chaitanya's life and acts.

 Caitanya-caritāmṛta ( 1557 or 1580 or 1615; Bengali)
 By Krishnadasa Kaviraja. Three parts: Adi-lila, Madhya-lila, and Antya-lila. Massive authoritative composition of Chaitanya's biography and teachings. According to Manring, he draws liberally from previous writers (poets, theologians and biographers) as he deems correct, omitting Kavi Karnapura's works perceived as threatening Rupa's authority.

 Caitanya-Mangala ( 1560 or late 1500s; Bengali)
 By Jayananda. Nine parts: Adikhanda, Nadiyakhanda, Vairagyakhanda, Sannyaskhanda, Utkalkhanda, Prakashkhanda, Tirthakhanda, Vijaykhanda, and Uttarkhanda. Biographical poem in the form of a narrative play focused on Chaitanya's godly image. It is the only work in which his death is mentioned. Introduction mentions several previous biographers, of whom only Vrindavan is known. Written for the common people (not devotees).

 Chaitanya Mangala ( 1560–66 or 1575)
 By Lochana Dasa ( Trilocan Dasa). Four parts: Sutrakhanda, Adikhanda, Madhyakhanda, and Antyakhanda. A narrative play depicting Chaitanya's childhood activities and his human side without highlighting any divine matters to make it popular. Influenced by Murari Gupta's Krsna-Caitanya-Caritamrta and Vrindavana Dasa Thakura's Chaitanya Bhagavata as well as the Mahabharata and different Puranas.

 Chaitanya-chandrodaya-kaumudi (Bengali)
 By Premadas (Purushottam Mishra). A verse adaptation to Kavi Karnapura's Caitanya-candrodaya-natakam drama.

 Gaura-ganoddesha-dipika ( 1576)
 By Kavi Karnapura (Paramanand Sen).

 Chaitanya-samhita (Bengali)
 By Bhagirath Bandhu. Work follows the tradition of agama or tantric texts in its presentation as a story told by Shiva to his spouse.

 Chaitanya-vilasa ( 1500s; Odia)
 By Madhava Dasa. A short poetical work in ten sections dealing with the life of Chaitanya. The poet probably came into contact with the saint when the latter came to Puri.

 Gauranga-vijay ( 1500s)
 By Chundamani dasa. Biographical epic, believed to have been written in three volumes, only part of the first volume still exists. It contains some information about Chaitanya, Nityananda and Madhavendra Puri not found elsewhere.

 Sriman-mahaprabhor-asta-kaliya-lila-smarana-mangala-stotram ( late 1600s; Sanskrit)
 By Visvanatha Chakravarti. Eleven sutras (seed verses) describing the eternal eight-fold daily pastimes of the fair-complexioned Lord.

 Sri Gauranga-Lilamrta ( late 1600s – 1700s; Bengali)
 By Krishna Dasa (disciple of Visvanatha Chakravarti). Expounded on his guru's eleven sutras, often quoting verses from Vrindavana Dasa Thakura's Chaitanya Bhagavata, plus songs by Narahari Ghanashyama (author of Bhakti-Ratnakara) and Lochana Dasa (author of Chaitanya-Mangala).

 Caitanya-upanisad
 A book that is a part of the Atharvaveda which offers overwhelming evidence of Lord Caitanya's identity as the Supreme Lord and Yuga Avatara.

 Sri Caitanya-caranamrta Bhasva (1887)
 By Srila Bhaktivinoda Thakura. Commentary on an original handwritten manuscript of the Caitanya-upanisad from one pandita, Madhusudana Maharaja, of Sambala-Pura.

 Amrita-pravaha-bhashya ( late 1800s – early 1900s; Sanskrit)
 By Bhaktivinoda Thakur. Commentary on Caitanya-upanisad.

 Anubhāsya (1915)
 By Bhaktisiddhanta Sarasvati. Commentary on Krishnadasa Kaviraja's Caitanya-caritāmṛta

 Śrī Caitanya-caritāmṛta (1974; English)
 By A. C. Bhaktivedanta Swami in English with original Bengali and Sanskrit. Commentary on Krishnadasa Kaviraja's Caitanya-caritāmṛta, based on Bhaktivinoda Thakur's Amrita-pravaha-bhashya and Bhaktisiddhanta Sarasvati's Anubhāsya commentaries.

 Krishna-Caitanya, His Life and His Teachings (2014; English)                           
 By Walther Eidlitz, originally written in German - Kṛṣṇa-Caitanya: sein Leben und seine Lehre, and published by Stockholm University, 1968, as a part of the scientific series "Stockholm studies in comparative religion".

Identity
According to the hagiographies of 16th-century authors, he exhibited his Universal Form same as had Lord Krishna on number of occasions, notably to Advaita Ācārya and Nityānanda Prabhu.

When Rupa Goswami first met the Chaitanya Mahaprabhu, he saw the divinity in him and composed the following verse:
"O most munificent incarnation! You are Krishna Himself appearing as Sri Krishna Caitanya Mahaprabhu. You have assumed the golden colour of Srimati Radharani, and You are widely distributing pure love of Krishna. We offer our respectful obeisances unto You." 

The evidence for the belief that the Chaitanya Mahaprabhu is an incarnation of Lord Krishna is found in the Srimad Bhagavatam:

Also in some other Scriptures like Vishnu Sahasranama, Bhavishya Purana, Padma Purana, Garuda Purana there are references of Chaitanaya Mahaprabhu being incarnation of Krishna. Evidences such as the Krishna-varnam verse SB 11.5.32 have many interpretations by scholars, including  Sridhara Svami who is accepted as authority by Mahaprabhu himself.

Gaudiya Vaishnavas consider Chaitanya to be Lord Krishna himself but appearing in the covered form (channa avatāra) who appeared in the Kali Yuga as his own devotee to show the easiest way to achieve Krishna Consciousness. The Gaudiya Vaishnava acharya Bhaktivinoda Thakura had also found out the rare manuscript of Chaitanya Upanisad of the Atharvaveda section, which reveals the identity of Chaitanya. There are various evidences in the Hindu scriptures to show that, Chaitanya Mahaprabhu was non-different from Krishna. Unlike the other avatars of Krishna he did not kill any demon. Mahaprabhu brought light to the chanting of Hare Krishna Mahamantra. According to Chaitanya Bhagavat, which gives a detailed description of Mahaprabhu's life, Mahaprabhu made a prediction that the holy name of Krishna will be sung in every town and village of the world and this is evident in the history. International Society of Krishna Consciousness was started by Srila Prabhupada in the USA, proved the prediction to be correct.

Teachings

Lord Chaitanya's direct teachings are recorded in Sanskrit verses called Siksastakam (though, in Vaishnava Padavali it is said: "Chaitanya himself wrote many songs on the Radha-Krishna theme").

Chaitanya's epistemological, theological and ontological teachings are summarised as ten root principles called dasa mula.

 The statements of amnaya (scripture) are the chief proof. By these statements the following nine topics are taught.
 Krishna is the Supreme Absolute Truth.
 Krishna is endowed with all energies.
 Krishna is the source of all rasa- flavor, quality, or spiritual rapture/emotions.
 The jivas (individual souls) are all separated parts of the Lord.
 In the bound state (non-liberated) the jivas are under the influence of matter, due to their tatastha (marginal) nature.
 In the liberated state the jivas are free from the influence of matter.
 The jivas and the material world are both different from and identical to the Lord.
 Pure devotion is the only way to attain liberation.
 Pure love of Krishna is the ultimate goal.

Philosophy and tradition

Chaitanya Mahaprabhu is said to be a disciple of Isvara Puri who was a disciple of Madhavendra Puri who was a disciple of Lakshmipati Tirtha who was a disciple of Vyasatirtha(1469-1539) of Madhvacharya's Sampradaya. Despite having been initiated in the Madhvacharya tradition and taking sannyasa from Shankara's tradition, Chaitanya's philosophy is sometimes regarded as a tradition of his own within the Vaishnava framework – having some marked differences with the practices and the theology of other followers of Madhvacharya. He took Mantra Upadesa from Isvara Puri and Sanyasa Diksha from Keshava Bharati.

Chaitanya is not known to have written anything himself except for a series of verses known as the Siksastaka, or "eight verses of instruction", which he had spoken, and were recorded by one of his close colleagues. The eight verses created by Chaitanya are considered to contain the complete philosophy of Gaudiya Vaishnavism in condensed form. Chaitanya requested a select few among his followers (who later came to be known as the Six Gosvamis of Vrindavan) to systematically present the theology of bhakti he had taught to them in their own writings. The six saints and theologians were Rupa Goswami, Sanatana Goswami, Gopala Bhatta Goswami, Raghunatha Bhatta Goswami, Raghunatha Dasa Goswami and Jiva Goswami, a nephew of brothers Rupa and Sanatana. These individuals were responsible for systematising Gaudiya Vaishnava theology.

Narottama Dasa, Srinivasa Acharya and Shyamananda Mandal were among the stalwarts of the second generation of Gaudiya Vaishnavism. Having studied under Jiva Goswami, they were instrumental in propagating the teachings of the Goswamis throughout Bengal, Odisha and other regions of Eastern India. Many among their associates, such as Ramacandra Kaviraja and Ganga Narayan Chakravarti, were also eminent teachers in their own right.

In the early 17th century Kalachand Vidyalankar, a disciple of Chaitanya, made his preachings popular in Bengal. He travelled throughout India popularising the gospel of anti-untouchability, social justice and mass education. He probably initiated 'Pankti Bhojon' and Krishna Sankirtan in the eastern part of Bengal. Several schools (sampradaya) have been practising it for hundreds of years. Geetashree Chabi Bandyopadhyay and Radharani Devi are among many who achieved fame by singing kirtan. The Dalits in Bengal, at that time a neglected and underprivileged caste, readily accepted his libertarian outlook and embraced the doctrine of Mahaprabhu. His disciples were known as Kalachandi Sampraday, who inspired the people to eradicate illiteracy and casteism. Many consider Kalachand as the Father of Rationalism in East Bengal (Purba Banga).

The festival of Kheturi, presided over by Jahnava Thakurani, the wife of Nityananda, was the first time the leaders of the various branches of Chaitanya's followers assembled together. Through such festivals, members of the loosely organised tradition became acquainted with other branches along with their respective theological and practical nuances. Around these times, the disciples and descendants of Nityananda and Advaita Acharya, headed by Virabhadra and Krishna respectively, started their family lineages (vamsa) to maintain the tradition. The vamsa descending from Nityananda through his son Virabhadra forms the most prominent branch of the modern Gaudiya tradition, though descendants of Advaita, along with the descendants of many other associates of Chaitanya, maintain their following especially in the rural areas of Bengal. Gopala Guru Goswami, a young associate of Chaitanya and a follower of Vakresvara Pandit, founded another branch based in Odisha. The writings of Gopala, along with those of his disciple Dhyanacandra Goswami, have had a substantial influence on the methods of internal worship in the tradition.

From the very beginning of Chaitanya's bhakti movement in Bengal, Haridasa Thakur and others, Muslim or Hindu by birth, were participants. Sri Ramakrishna Paramahamsa, the great sage of Dakshineswar, who lived in the 19th century, emphasised the bhakti marga of Chaitanya, whom he referred to as "Gauranga." (The Gospel of Sri Ramakrishna). This openness received a boost from Bhaktivinoda Thakura's broad-minded vision in the late 19th century and was institutionalised by Bhaktisiddhanta Sarasvati in his Gaudiya Matha in the 20th century.

In the 20th century the teachings of Chaitanya were brought to the West. For the first time, by  Baba Premananda Bharati (1858–1914), author of Sree Krishna—the Lord of Love (1904)—the first full-length treatment of Gaudiya Vaishnavism in English, who founded in 1902 the short-lived "Krishna Samaj" society in New York City and built a temple in Los Angeles. He belonged to the circle of guru Prabhu Jagadbandhu with teachings similar to the later ISKCON mission. His followers later formed several organizations, including now defunct the Order of Living Service and the AUM Temple of Universal Truth. Another prominent missionary was A. C. Bhaktivedanta Swami Prabhupada (1896-1977), a representative of the Bhaktisiddhanta Sarasvati branch of Chaitanya's tradition. Prabhupada founded his movement known as The International Society for Krishna Consciousness (ISKCON) to spread Chaitanya's teachings throughout the world. Saraswata gurus and acharyas, members of the Goswami lineages and several other Hindu sects which revere Chaitanya Mahaprabhu, including devotees from the major Vaishnava holy places in Mathura District, West Bengal and Odisha, also established temples dedicated to Krishna and Chaitanya outside India in the closing decades of the 20th century. In the 21st century, Vaishnava bhakti is now also being studied through the academic medium of Krishnology in a number of academic institutions.

Cultural legacy

Chaitanya's influence on the cultural legacy in Bengal, Odisha and Manipur, has been significant, with many residents performing daily worship to him as an avatar of Krishna. Some attribute to him a Renaissance in Bengal, different from the more well-known 19th-century Bengal Renaissance. Salimullah Khan (b. 1958), a noted Bangladeshi linguist, maintains, "Sixteenth-century is the time of Chaitanya Dev, and it is the beginning of Modernism in Bengal. The concept of 'humanity' that came into fruition is contemporaneous with that of Europe".

Noted Bengali biographical film on Chaitanya, Nilachaley Mahaprabhu (1957), was directed by Kartik Chattopadhyay (1912–1989). A Bengali film based on Chaitanya's demise, Lawho Gouranger Naam Re, will be directed by Srijit Mukherji where Parambrata Chatterjee will be seen portraying Chaitanya Mahaprabhu.

See also
 Vrindavan
 Gauranga
 Jagannath Temple (Puri)
 Pancha Tattva (Vaishnavism)
 Prabhupāda

References

Works cited

Further reading

External links
 
 

 
 
 Gaudiya Vaishnavism – The Tradition of Chaitanya
 Caitanya Upanisad
 Caitanya Bhagavata Biography
 Gaudiya Vaishnavism – The Tradition of Chaitanya
 Life of Sri Chaitanya Mahaprabhu
 Scriptural Statements/Predictions regarding Caitanya Mahaprabhu's birth
 Lord Gouranga and His Message of Devotion (theosophical.ca)
 YogPeeth, Mayapur, Navadvipa – The birthplace of Sri Caitanya Mahaprabhu
 at Chaitaniya mahaprabhu biography
 Who is Lord Chaitanya?
 Scriptural References To Sri Chaitanya Mahaprabhu being Avataar of Sri Krishna

1486 births
1533 deaths
16th-century Hindu religious leaders
Bengali Hindus
Bhakti movement
Devotees of Krishna
Devotees of Jagannath
Dvaitin philosophers
Gaudiya religious leaders
Hindu ascetics
Hindu mystics
Hindu revivalists
Hindu philosophers and theologians
Indian social reformers
Indian Hindu monks
16th-century Indian philosophers
Indian Hindu spiritual teachers
Indian Vaishnavites
Kirtan performers
Vaishnava saints
People considered avatars by their followers
Scholars from Odisha
People from Nadia district
Scholars from West Bengal
Bengali Hindu saints
Brahmins who fought against discrimination
Anti-caste activists